The Passion Flower is a 1921 American drama film starring Norma Talmadge, Courtenay Foote, and Eulalie Jensen, and directed by Herbert Brenon. It is based on the 1913 Spanish play The Unloved Woman (Spanish: La malquerida)  by Jacinto Benavente. The play was translated into English by John Garrett Underhill as The Passion Flower and successfully produced in 1920 in New York City. The plot of the film involves the forbidden love of a man for his stepdaughter which leads to tragedy and murder.

Plot
As described in a film publication, Esteban's (Foote) jealousy for his stepdaughter Acacia (Talmadge) results in his servant Rubio (Wilson) telling Acacia's sweetheart Norbert (Ford) that she loves another. Their betrothal is broken, and later Acacia accepts Faustino (Agnew). Rubio kills Faustino, and Norbert is tried for the crime but acquitted. When it becomes known that Esteban was the cause of the murder, he flees into the mountains, but later returns to give himself up. Raimunda (Jensen), Acacia's mother and Esteban's wife, pleads with Acacia to accept the stepfather whom she hates. During the long embrace which follows between Esteban and Acacia, Raimunda learns of Esteban's love for his stepdaughter and her own love turns to hate. Raimunda calls for help and during Esteban's attempt to escape with Acacia he shoots his wife and is then arrested. Raimunda dies in the arms of Acacia.

Cast

Court case
Underhill, who had translated the Spanish play into English as The Passion Flower, sued in New York state court after the play was filmed without his permission. On appeal, the opinion by Chief Judge Benjamin N. Cardozo agreed that the contractual transfer of dramatic rights to produce a play did not include films, and that Underhill deserved damages but not all profits from the film.

Preservation
The Library of Congress has a print of The Passion Flower, though there is a bit of deterioration in the first scene and a "lapse of continuity" near the end of this copy.

References

External links

American romantic drama films
American black-and-white films
American films based on plays
Films directed by Herbert Brenon
1921 romantic drama films
First National Pictures films
American silent feature films
1921 films
1920s American films
Silent romantic drama films
Silent American drama films